Allotinus albifasciatus is a butterfly in the family Lycaenidae. It was described by John Nevill Eliot in 1980. It is found on Sumatra and Peninsular Malaysia.

References

Butterflies described in 1980
Allotinus